Parakylia Station is a pastoral lease that once operated as a sheep station but now operates as a cattle station in outback South Australia.

Description
The property shares boundaries with Mount Eba, Billa Kalina and Millers Creek Stations to the north, Mount Vivian to the west and Roxby Downs Station to the south and east. It is also situated within the Woomera Rocket Range, and the Dingo Fence passes through the property.

The country is composed of open tablelands vegetated with saltbush, cottonbush, myall, mulga and sandalwood. The area is interspersed with sand ridges, but has several ephemeral creeks and some swamp areas that hold some surface water.

History
The name of the property is a corruption of the traditional owners' word parakilia, which is used to describe the succulent annual portulacaceous plants of the genus Calandrinia that are found in the area.

The station was established at some time prior to 1880; in this year it was placed on the market and was stocked with 30,000 sheep.

By 1884 the  property was stocked with 15,000 sheep, 800 cattle, 100 horses and had purchased 40 camels for the transportation of supplies.

The property was initially established by Andrew Wooldridge, who obtained the lease for a vast tract of land including Parakylia and Arcoona Stations. Charles William Bowman joined the partnership late then Charles Chewings retired from the enterprise in 1882. A post office was situated on the station between 1884 and 1898. Shearing in 1894 expected between 35,000 and 50,000 sheep to be shorn. By 1899 the run was abandoned after problems with dingos attacking stock. Good rains fell later that year and there was plenty of feed available, stock was reintroduced and the next year shearing recommenced.

F and M Collins owned Parakylia in 1912 and were selling both wool and bullocks to local markets. By 1915 the  property was unoccupied again and open for application. It had been  subdivided into 23 paddocks and was enclosed by a mix of five- and six-wire fences, but was passed in at £10,760. Parakylia Pty. Ltd. was formed in 1927 to acquire the property. The company was established with £60,000 capital.
 
In 1954 the executors of the trustees advertised for a manager to run Parakylia, which was stocked with 14,000 sheep.

The land occupying the extent of the Parakylia pastoral lease was gazetted by the Government of South Australia as a locality in April 2013 under the name "Parakylia".

See also
List of ranches and stations

References

Stations (Australian agriculture)
Pastoral leases in South Australia
Far North (South Australia)